Mamadou Yaye Kanouté (born 7 October 1993) is a Senegalese professional who plays  for Italian club Avellino Calcio.

Career
He made his Serie C debut for Benevento on 23 October 2011 in a game against Pisa.

On 30 July 2015, he was loaned to Lega Pro club Ischia along with Antonio Porcino.

Career statistics

Club

References

External links
 

1993 births
Living people
Footballers from Dakar
Senegalese footballers
Association football forwards
Serie A players
Serie B players
Serie C players
Lega Pro Seconda Divisione players
Benevento Calcio players
S.C. Vallée d'Aoste players
S.S. Ischia Isolaverde players
S.S. Juve Stabia players
F.C. Pro Vercelli 1892 players
U.S. Catanzaro 1929 players
Palermo F.C. players
U.S. Avellino 1912 players
Senegalese expatriate footballers
Senegalese expatriate sportspeople in Italy
Expatriate footballers in Italy